The Hall of the Saints or the Sala dei Santi is a room in the Borgia Apartment of the Vatican Palace, frescoed by the Italian Renaissance artist, Pinturicchio. It dates to 1491–1494 and was commissioned by Pope Alexander VI. The frescoes depict scenes from the lives of the saints. The ceiling fresco, which depicts myths related to the ancient Egyptian gods Osiris and Isis, has been the subject of much scholarly attention. The iconographic program reflects the humanistic interests of Alexander and was likely designed by his secretary, Giovanni Annio of Viterbo.

Gallery

References
 Curran, Brian. 2007. The Egyptian Renaissance: the afterlife of ancient Egypt in early modern Italy. Chicago: University of Chicago Press.
 Riess, J. B. (1984). "Raphael's Stanze and Pinturiccio's Borgia Apartment." Source (New York, N.Y.), 3(4), 57–67.

Notes

1490s paintings
Paintings by Pinturicchio
Vatican City art